Gul Imam is a village in Tank District of Khyber Pakhtunkhwa province in Pakistan. It is located around 15 km from Tank town in Tank district.

Overview 
Gul Imam is one of 16 Union council in the Tank District of Khyber Pakhtunkhwa in Pakistan. Nearbly villages are Abizar, Sherbati, Pai and Ama Khel.

See also 

 Ama Khel
 Tank District

References

External links
Khyber-Pakhtunkhwa Government website section on Lower Dir
United Nations
Hajjinfo.org Uploads
PBS paiman.jsi.com 

Tank District
Populated places in Tank District
Union councils of Khyber Pakhtunkhwa
Union Councils of Tank District